Gerd Frickhöffer (21 November 1913 – 4 July 1980) was a German film and television actor. He appeared as Captain Donvan in the television detective series Sergeant Berry.

Selected filmography
 Chemistry and Love (1948)
 Everything Will Be Better in the Morning (1948)
 Das Mädchen Christine (1949)
 Nights on the Nile (1949)
 One Night Apart (1950)
 The Merry Wives of Windsor (1950)
 Veronika the Maid (1951)
 Professor Nachtfalter (1951)
 The Last Year (1951)
 The White Adventure  (1952)
 Mikosch Comes In (1952)
 The Little Czar (1954)
 Clivia (1954)
 Emil and the Detectives (1954)
 Swelling Melodies (1955)
 Love Is Just a Fairytale (1955)
 Mamitschka (1955)
 Yes, Yes, Love in Tyrol (1955)
 Black Forest Melody (1956)
 The Old Forester House (1956)
 Victor and Victoria (1957)
 Majestät auf Abwegen (1958)
 The Csardas King (1958)
 A Woman Who Knows What She Wants (1958)
 That Won't Keep a Sailor Down (1958)
 A Thousand Stars Aglitter (1959)
 Old Heidelberg (1959)
 Glück und Liebe in Monaco (1959)
 The Juvenile Judge (1960)
 The Sweet Life of Count Bobby (1962)
 The White Spider (1963)
 Rampage at Apache Wells (1965)
 Dead Body on Broadway (1969)
 The Body in the Thames (1971)
 The Maddest Car in the World (1975)

External links

1913 births
1980 deaths
German male film actors
German male television actors
20th-century German male actors